Friedrich Karl Hermann Kruse (21 July 1790 – 3 August 1866) was a German historian born in Oldenburg.

In 1813 he obtained his doctorate from the University of Leipzig. Beginning in 1816 he taught classes at Maria Magdalena Gymnasium in Breslau, and in 1821 was appointed professor of ancient and medieval history and geography at the University of Halle. From 1828 to 1853 he was a professor at the University of Dorpat.

Written works 
Among his better known writings were Budorgis, oder das alte Schlesien vor der Einführung der christlichen Religion (Budorgis, or Ancient Silesia before the Introduction of the Christian Religion, 1819) and Deutsche Altertümer (German Antiquities, 1824–29, three volumes). Other noted works by Kruse include:
 De Istri ostiis, 1820
 Hellas, oder geographisch-antiquarische Darstellung des alten Griechenland (Hellas, or Geographical-Antique Representation of Ancient Greece); 1825–27, three volumes
 Anastasis der Waräger, 1841 
 Nekrolivonika, oder Altertümer von Liv-, Esth- und Kurland ("Nekrolivonika", or Antiquities of Livonia, Estonia and Kurland), 1842 
 Russische Altertümer (Russian Antiquities), 1844–45 
 Urgeschichte der Ostseeprovinzen (Prehistory of the Baltic Sea Provinces), 1846 
 Chronicon Nortmannorum, 1851

References 
  translated biography @ Meyers Konversations-Lexikon

Academic staff of the University of Tartu
Academic staff of the University of Halle
People from Oldenburg (city)
1790 births
1866 deaths
19th-century German historians
German male non-fiction writers